The North Luzon East Expressway (NLEE) is an under-construction four-lane,  long limited-access toll expressway in the Central Luzon region of the Philippines.

Project description

Phase 1 
Also known as La Mesa Parkways Project, the first phase of NLEE starts as a  toll road, beginning in Commonwealth Avenue - La Mesa Parkway and/or junction of C–6 in San Jose del Monte, before continuing to Bigte, Norzagaray with an interchange at San Jose del Monte, Bulacan (Tungkong Mangga). NLEE then continues from Norzagaray before passing through the towns of Bulacan like Santa Maria, Angat, San Ildefonso, and San Miguel. Bridges will be required for the project to cross Bulacan's major waterway, Angat River.

Phase 2 
The entire next phase of NLEE will be located in Nueva Ecija. It shall pass through the cities and towns of Gapan, San Leonardo, and Santa Rosa parallel to the Pan-Philippine Highway (AH26). Bridges will also be needed to cross rivers like the Peñaranda River, and Pampanga River. The expressway ends in Cabanatuan, connecting with the partially-completed Central Luzon Link Expressway.

The completion of the expressway has yet to be determined. However, NLEE will decongest the Central Luzon segment of the Pan-Philippine Highway once completed. It shall provide a faster route to Cagayan Valley, creating a more efficient trade route between the cities and municipalities of Bulacan and Nueva Ecija, and Metro Manila. The project will also cater to women to work in its construction to promote gender equality in the workforce.

Project bidding

The project's concessionaire was awarded to Ausphil Tollways Corporation (ATC).

Project timeline

On July 13, 2015, Pertconsult International submitted the Final Report of the Business Case Study to PPP Service.
The report was returned to Pertconsult on July 30, 2015 with comments and recommendations for consideration on the revision of the Final Report.
The Consultant resubmitted the Final Report of the Business Case Study to PPP Service on April 20, 2016 which is now under review.
DPWH has agreed that the Transaction Advisors (TAs) for the conduct of Feasibility Study will be procured through PDMF and included in the task of the TAs is to review and finalize the financial model provided by the consultant, Pertconsult International.
A meeting was held on 25 January 2017 at PPP Center to discuss the Technical Working Group (TWG) for the project and the schedule of procurement.
Ongoing preparation of Draft Terms of Reference (TOR) by PPP Center.
On June 4, 2022, NLEE has been signed recently among respective government agencies, with SMC Infrastructure as the proponent.

Future exits

Phase 1, Stage 1 (Northeast Metro Manila Expressway / La Mesa Parkway)

Phase 1, Stage 2

Phase 2

Project status

Development Bank of the Philippines (DBP), in its letter dated February 11, 2015, expressed their interest in participating in the North Luzon East Expressway (NLEE) Project as Transaction Advisors.
DPWH provided DBP with electronic copy of the Draft Final Report of the Business Case Study on March 3, 2015.
DPWH quoted that the construction of the expressway will begin on Q4, 2016.

References 

Proposed roads in the Philippines
Roads in Metro Manila
Roads in Bulacan
Roads in Nueva Ecija